San Paolo alla Regola, a church in the Regola area of Rome, was made a cardinalate deaconry by Pope Pius XII in 1946. Its present Cardinal-Deacon, since 21 November 2010, is Francesco Monterisi, archpriest emeritus of the Basilica of Saint Paul Outside the Walls.

List of Cardinal Deacons
Alojzije Stepinac (1952-1960; never possessed) 
Giuseppe Fietta (1958-1960) 
Michael Browne, O.P. (1962-1971) 
Francesco Monterisi (2010-)

Titular churches
Roman Catholic churches in Rome
Churches of Rome (rione Regola)